Thunderbolt is the name of two fictional characters appearing in American comic books published by Marvel Comics.

Publication history
The William Carver version of Thunderbolt first appeared in Daredevil #69 and was created by Roy Thomas, Gene Colan, and Syd Shores.

The Luis Barrett version of Thunderbolt first appeared in Incredible Hulk Annual #17 and was created by Gary Barnum, John Stanisci, and Tim Dzon.

Fictional character biography

William Carver

William Carver was born in Harlem, New York. Returning to Harlem after military service, William was approached by several members of a local violent street gang named the Thunderbolts which Turk Barrett was a part of. The Thunderbolts are eager to have William in their group for his military training. Carver refused and the next day went to work as an assistant district attorney under then-district attorney Franklin Nelson. When Nelson learned of Carver's encounter with the Thunderbolts gang, he instructed Carver to infiltrate them to gather enough information about their illegal activities to shut them down. Carver helped gather enough evidence to send several members to prison.

Months later, William's younger brother Lonnie Carver was gunned down in front of him. At the funeral, William spotted Lonnie's murderer and chased him through the cemetery. As the two men struggled, a bolt of lightning hit them, killing the sniper instantly. Carver was saved by an experimental cobalt radiation treatment during which he was unintentionally exposed to an unusual amount of radiation. The radiation mutated his body to give him the ability to move at superhuman speeds and enhanced his reflexes. Carver began a career as a costumed crime-fighter calling himself Thunderbolt after his first criminal enemies and tried to discover who had ordered Lonnie's assassination.

Carver soon discovered that the radiation he was exposed to sped up not only his reflexes, but his aging as he was now aging at a rate of several years per week. Carver tracked down his old ally Power Man and Power Man's ally Iron Fist to help him find Lonnie's killer. They discovered that it had been attorney Big Ben Donovan whose younger brother Paul had been one of the Thunderbolts gang members that William Carver sent to prison. Paul Donovan was killed in prison by some Maggia operatives and Big Ben Donovan blamed Carver for his death sending an assassin to kill William's brother Lonnie in revenge. After his confession, Big Ben Donovan pulled a gun on Thunderbolt during the fight with Caesar Cicero's men. As the two men struggled, the gun went off and accidentally shot Donovan. Thunderbolt's mission completed, he succumbed to his body's rapid aging and died with the content that his brother's murder had been avenged.

Luis Barrett

Luis Barrett had somehow obtained superhuman speed while in high school. He came from a poor family and knew that he would not obtain a scholarship after he graduated. Justin Hammer later learned of Luis' powers and sent Barrier, Blacklash, and Ringer II to bring Luis to him. Using his business connections, Justin Hammer obtained William Carver's Thunderbolt costume. Then he gave the costume to Luis Barrett so that he can convince him to join Hammer's criminal enterprises in exchange for funding his college scholarship. When members of the Pantheon warned Luis of Hammer's intentions, Luis turned against Justin Hammer's villain allies during a plot to steal an experimental plane from Air Force One base. Ringer bound Thunderbolt's legs during the fight. Before Blacklash could attack Thunderbolt, he managed to take out Blacklash despite the fact that his legs were bound. Although Luis was left with no other means of going to college, Ulysses noted that Luis is now on the right track.

Luis was considered as a "potential recruit" for the Initiative program.

Powers and abilities
The William Carver version of Thunderbolt had superhuman speed and quick reflexes. The visor of his costume can produce an intense blinding light which he would use as a last resort.

The Luis Barrett version of Thunderbolt has superhuman speed.

References

External links
 Thunderbolt (William Carver) at Marvel Wiki
 Thunderbolt (Luis Barrett) at Marvel Wiki
 
 

Characters created by Gene Colan
Characters created by Roy Thomas
Fictional assistant district attorneys
Marvel Comics characters who can move at superhuman speeds
Marvel Comics superheroes
Vigilante characters in comics